Originally developed in 2019 by software giant, Microsoft.
under the name Coco, and later rebranded to Confidential Consortium Framework; (CCF) is an open-source framework for the development of a new category performant applications that focus on the optimization of secure multi-party computation and data availability. Intended to accelerate the adoption of blockchain technology by enterprise; CCF can enable a variety of high-scale, confidential permissioned distributed ledger networks that meet key enterprise requirements.

Overview
CCF provides a multi-party computation (MPC) model of programming that prioritizes highly-available data storage and a universally-verifiable data log implemented a ledger abstraction. 

As a permissioned framework, CCF leverages trust in a consortium of governing members and in a network of replicated hardware-protected execution environments (also known as trusted execution environments [TEEs] such as Intel Software Guard Extensions [SGX].)to achieve high throughput, low latency, strong integrity and strong confidentiality for application data and code executing on the ledger. CCF embeds consensus protocols with Byzantine and crash fault tolerant configurations. All configurations support strong service integrity based on the ledger contents. Even if some replicas are corrupt or their keys are compromised, they can be blamed based on their signed evidence of malicious activity recorded in the ledger. CCF supports transparent, programmable governance where the power of the consortium members is tunable and their activity is similarly recorded in the ledger for full auditability.

The framework is designed and built on a 6-point foundation of:

 Governance: Transparent, programmable consortium-style proposal and voting based governance that supports enterprise operating models
 Service Integrity: Hardware-backed integrity for application logic and data
 Confidentiality and Privacy: All transactions are confidential by default
 Performance: Database-like throughput, low latency, deterministic commits
 Efficiency: Minimal execution overhead compared to traditional solutions
 Resiliency: High availability and secure disaster recovery

Appearances

F.O.S.D.E.M. 
The Confidential Consortium Framework was presented at Free and Open source Software Developers' European Meeting FOSDEM 2020 in Brussels, Belgium. The CCF source code is licensed under Apache 2.0 License and available on GitHub. It runs on Linux and, according to Microsoft, it is primarily developed and tested on Ubuntu 18.04.

See also

Hyperledger Sawtooth
Enterprise Ethereum Alliance
Confidential Computing Consortium

References

Further reading
 
FOSDEM 2020 The Confidential Consortium Framework

External links
 Confidential Consortium Framework - Microsoft Research

Blockchains
C++ libraries
Distributed computing
Python (programming language) libraries
Free and open-source software
Microsoft free software
Microsoft Research
Software using the Apache license
2019 software
Linux-only free software